Psilorhynchus brachyrhynchus is a freshwater ray-finned fish, from the upper Ayeyarwaddy River drainage in northern Myanmar.

References

 

brachyrhynchus
Fish of Asia
Fish of Myanmar
Taxa named by Kevin W. Conway
Taxa named by Ralf Britz
Fish described in 2013